The National Scouting Museum is the official museum of the Boy Scouts of America.

Background
The museum was first opened in 1959 in North Brunswick, New Jersey as the Johnston Memorial Museum. With the relocation of the Boy Scouts of America National Headquarters from New Jersey to Texas, the museum closed in 1979.

In 1986 the museum reopened on the campus of Murray State University in western Kentucky. Museum officials had predicted that 120,000 people annually would visit the Kentucky location, but by the late 1990s yearly attendance was under 20,000.

In October 2002 the museum moved to Irving, Texas, across the road from the Boy Scouts of America National Headquarters. The Irving museum closed on September 4, 2017. 

On May 29, 2018 the museum reopened at Philmont Scout Ranch in Cimarron, New Mexico, with a grand opening on September 15, 2018.

Exhibits
The National Scouting Museum contains two large exhibit halls. 

Exhibit Hall A focuses on the history of the Boy Scouts of America, including displays that feature historic camping gear, uniforms, merit badges, and artwork. The gallery also has sections dedicated to the history of the Order of the Arrow, the first Eagle Scout award, Scout Jamborees, notable Scouts, service projects, and BSA Founders Robert Baden-Powell, Ernest Thompson Seton, Daniel Carter Beard, William D. Boyce, and James E. West.

Exhibit Hall B focuses on the history of Philmont Scout Ranch and the Southwest, including displays that feature a 3D topographical map of the ranch, weapons and firearms, an historic Santa Fe Trail stage wagon, Native American pottery and basketry, and artwork by Ernest Thompson Seton. The gallery also has sections dedicated to the history of local industries like lumber, mining, railroads, and ranching.

The museum's main lobby features a small exhibit on Scouting in outer space and Antarctica, as well as artwork that includes a 1914 Boy Scout advertising billboard from Mt. Gilead, Ohio, a bronze plaque of the Scout Oath and Law, and a bronze statue of a hiking Scout titled "The Trail to Manhood" by Peter Fillerup. 

The museum is home to a collection of over 600,000 artifacts that tell the story of the Boy Scouts of America, Philmont Scout Ranch, and the Southwest Region.

Seton Memorial Library

Housed within the National Scouting Museum, the Seton Memorial Library contains the library of Ernest Thompson Seton, one of the founders of the Boy Scouts of America. This research library contains Seton's personal collection and an extensive collection of volumes pertaining to western lore and the history of the area. In addition to the book collection itself, the library also features a large reading room, visiting scholar research room, and archive. 

The National Scouting Museum also holds Seton's art, anthropology, and natural history collections that were donated by Julia Seton to the former Philmont Museum (also known as the Seton Museum) in 1967 before its merger with the National Scouting Museum in 2018. Many items from the Seton Collections can be seen on display in the library and in Gallery B.

Other facilities
The National Scouting Museum features the 88-person Carl & Janice Marchetti Order of the Arrow Conference Room, along with a large gift shop that sells books, artwork, Southwestern jewelry, and other mementos.

References

External links
 National Scouting Museum Official Website
 National Scouting Museum Gift Shop Official Website
 

Boy Scouts of America
Scouting museums in the United States
History museums in New Mexico
Museums in Colfax County, New Mexico